Thomas Robert Chadwick (born 21 October 1991) is an English former first-class cricketer.

Chadwick was born at Norwich in October 1991. He was educated in North Yorkshire at Stokesley School, before going up to Worcester College, Oxford. While studying at Oxford, Chadwick made three first-class appearances in The University Match for Oxford University between 2011 and 2013. He scored 37 runs in his three matches, with a high score of 21.

References

External links

1992 births
Living people
Cricketers from Norwich
Alumni of Worcester College, Oxford
English cricketers
Oxford University cricketers